The Scottish Tartans Authority (STA) is a Scottish registered charity dedicated to the promotion, protection and preservation of Scotland's national cloth. Founded in 1995, the charitable purposes of the Authority are:
 to protect, preserve, conserve, promote and explain the culture, traditions and uses of Scottish Tartans and Highland Dress; and
 to advance and promote the education of the public about Scottish Tartans and Highland Dress and their respective origins, manufacture, use and development.

With the assistance of members and stakeholders, the STA fields enquiries each year and works in partnership with, and as advisors to, a range of public and private bodies.

The STA holds a collection of tartan and Highland Dress; costume, textiles, tartan records, manuscripts, books, other important artefacts.  It holds details of c.10,000 tartans within its core database and a number of items from the collection are on loan to various Museums, notably: National Museums Scotland, V&A Dundee, Braemar Highland Games Centre, The Gordon Highlanders Museum.

In November 2008, the Scottish Parliament passed the Scottish Register of Tartans Act and the Register was launched in February 2009.  At this point, the STA relinquished its registration responsibilities, having already gifted the contents of its core database to National Records of Scotland to assist in the setting up of The Scottish Register of Tartans (SRT). 

In 2017 The Scottish Tartans Authority gained the Royal Patronage of HRH The Prince Charles, Duke of Rothesay.  Following the death of HM The Queen in September 2022, a formal review of Royal Patronages was instigated.

Website 
The STA is developing a new website which will reflect the educational role of the registered charity and needs of members and stakeholders. It is hoped that the new website will launch in the summer of 2023.

See also 
 Scottish Register of Tartans

References

External links 
 Scottish Tartans Authority

1995 establishments in Scotland
Organisations based in Perth and Kinross
Tartan organisations